The Beardstown Bridge is a two-lane bridge that carries U.S. Route 67 (US 67) and Illinois Route 100 (IL 100) across the Illinois River between Schuyler County, Illinois and the city of Beardstown, Cass County, Illinois.  The bridge was built in 1955 and rehabilitated in 1985.  It is the northernmost and furthest upstream of the three Illinois River crossings used by IL 100, with the other two being at Florence and Hardin.

The bridge is appraised as structurally deficient, with a sufficiency rating of 40.2 out of 100 during its 2000 and 2010 inspections.  The IDOT estimates that it would cost $173 million to construct a replacement bridge and approach roads.  A new bridge is part of the plans for a U.S. 67 Corridor project.

See also

References

Bridges completed in 1955
Bridges over the Illinois River
Bridges of the United States Numbered Highway System
Transportation buildings and structures in Cass County, Illinois
Transportation buildings and structures in Schuyler County, Illinois
U.S. Route 67
Cantilever bridges in the United States
Warren truss bridges in the United States
Road bridges in Illinois
1955 establishments in Illinois